Thoughtful Songs for Little People is the third studio album by Australian children's music group, Teeny Tiny Stevies. It was released on 7 August 2020.

At the ARIA Music Awards of 2020, the album won the ARIA Award for Best Children's Album.

At the AIR Awards of 2021, the album won Best Independent Children's Album or EP.

Track listing
 "Superpower" - 3:07
 "Had You to Teach Me"	- 3:07
 "Happy Swimming" - 3:10
 "Can't Wait to Be Home" - 3:54
 "Plastic" - 2:34
 "Respect My Pet" - 3:00
 "Science"	- 3:40
 "Family Is a Team" - 3:48
 "Abilities" - 3:17
 "Things I Can Say" -3:28
 "Good for Your Health" - 2:53
 "Everything Comes to an End" - 3:12

Charts

References

2020 albums
ARIA Award-winning albums